The women's 1500 metres race of the 2013–14 ISU Speed Skating World Cup 4, arranged in Sportforum Hohenschönhausen, in Berlin, Germany, was held on 7 December 2013.

Ireen Wüst of the Netherlands won the race, while Katarzyna Bachleda-Curuś of Poland came second, and Lotte van Beek of the Netherlands came third. Jorien ter Mors of the Netherlands won the Division B race on a time that would have given her the win in Division A.

Results
The race took place on Saturday, 7 December, with Division B scheduled in the morning session, at 10:00, and Division A scheduled in the afternoon session, at 14:29.

Division A

Division B

References

Women 1500
4